Itoplectis maculator is a species of insect belonging to the family Ichneumonidae.

It is native to Europe. Hosts include Archips rosana and Tortrix viridana

References

Ichneumonidae
Insects described in 1775